Within the Wires is a dramatic anthology podcast in the style of epistolary fiction. In the first season, the listener, a medical inmate at a place called the institute, receives guidance from the mysterious narrator of instructional relaxation cassettes. In the second season, an artist named Roimata Mangakāhia communicates with the listener through a series of museum audio guides. The third season, "a political thriller set in 1950s Chicago", is narrated by the bureaucrat Michael Witten; listeners access letters and notes dictated to his secretary.

The series was created in 2016 by Jeffrey Cranor and Janina Matthewson (who also narrated the first season), and it has been published by Night Vale Presents since June 21, 2016. For the first five seasons during its run, the podcast aired on every other Wednesday, but starting with Season 6, changed to a weekly release. The first season ended on October 25, 2016; the second season premiered on September 5, 2017, the third on September 4, 2018, the fourth on September 9, 2019, the fifth on August 25, 2020, the sixth on October 12, 2021, and the seventh on October 18, 2022.

2021 also saw the publication of the first novel set in the Within the Wires world, You Feel It Just Below the Ribs. Written in the style of an annotated autobiography, it details the events of "the Great Reckoning" and the formation of the Society from the point of view of one of its survivors. The book was released on November 16, 2021. The audiobook was narrated by Kirsten Potter and Adepero Oduye.

Production
In an interview with CBC Radio's Podcast Playlist, Jeffrey Cranor explained that the initial idea behind the podcast was to use pre-existing audio guides as a template for storytelling, with the first season taking the form of a relaxation cassette program. Cranor had read and enjoyed Janina Matthewson's book "Of Things Gone Astray", and they first met when he messaged her on Twitter in Autumn 2015 inviting her to the live show for Welcome to Night Vale when it was touring through London. Cranor later pitched the initial idea to Matthewson and they began brainstorming story ideas together. Episodes are outlined by both Cranor and Matthewson, before being written by one of them and then edited by the other. Every season was written by Cranor and Matthewson, with music by Mary Epworth. From Season 4 onwards, Cranor and Matthewson also gain the titles of producer and director respectively. The first season was partially funded through sponsored advertising—a practice shared with other series under the Night Vale Presents banner such as Alice Isn't Dead and The Orbiting Human Circus (of the Air).

With the release of the final episode of the first season, it was announced that those who donate $50 or more to the podcast would receive an exclusive prologue episode for the second season, which was released on August 22, 2017. After the launch of their Patreon, the prologue episode was included in the same tier as the bonus Black Box episodes.

Episodes
Every episode was written by Jeffrey Cranor and Janina Matthewson.

Season 1: "Relaxation Cassettes"

Season 2: "Museum Audio Tours"
Prior to the season premiere, three trailers composed of preview segments from the season itself were released, on August 15, August 22, and August 29, 2017. Donors of $50 or more to the production of the second season received a special prologue episode, "Cassette 0: Karikari Contemporary (1969)", on August 22, 2017, with the release of the second trailer. Every episode in this season features a guest star voicing the curator of the museum.

Season 3: "Dictation"

Season 4: "The Cradle"

Season 5: "Voicemail"
As well as the main narrator voiced by Amiera Darwish, this season featured a secondary narrator voiced by Norma Butikofer at the end of every episode.

Season 6: "Caregiver"

Season 7: "Scavenger Hunt"

Bonus
Within the Wires' Patreon features an exclusive season called "Black Box," released four times a year, on solstices and equinoxes. The season tells the story of an unnamed pilot (narrated by Cranor), and his black box recordings.

Live
Within the Wires' first live show was performed by Janina Matthewson at London Podcast Festival on September 13, 2018. They did two live shows starring Lee LeBreton, one at Largo at the Coronet in Los Angeles, California on April 27, 2019 and one at PodX in Nashville on June 2, 2019.

Reception
Marc Hershon of the Huffington Post positively reviewed the second episode, stating that it "has a distinctive flavor all its own" and that the show is "every bit as warped as [Welcome to Night Vale]." Nathan Dorer of The Rensselaer Polytechnic positively reviewed the first season, finding that "the evolution of the podcast throughout the first season was borderline artful" and praising Matthewson's narration and the "effective" atmosphere of the podcast. Steve Greene of IndieWire similarly praised the podcast as "an off-kilter delight" and observed that it was "something that can only exist in this medium." Devon Taylor of The Sarahs observed that because the story is "parceled out slowly" it could "frustrate listeners accustomed to a more linear plot", while also drawing positive comparisons to Lost and the works of David Lynch.

References

External links
 

Science fiction podcasts
Audio podcasts
2016 podcast debuts
American alternate history works
Dystopian fiction
Works set in psychiatric hospitals
American podcasts
Scripted podcasts
Patreon creators
Night Vale Presents